Phaseolin is a prenylated pterocarpan found in French bean (Phaseolus vulgaris) seeds and in the stems of Erythrina subumbrans.

References

Pterocarpans